Arenibacillus is a Gram-negative, aerobic, rod-shaped and non-motile bacterial genus from the family Rhodobacteraceae with one known species (Arenibacillus arenosus). Arenibacillus arenosus has been isolated from sand.

References

Rhodobacteraceae
Bacteria genera
Taxa described in 2019
Monotypic bacteria genera